HSB ("the Savings and Construction Association of the Tenants") is a cooperative association for housing in Sweden. Members of the association are HSB's customers, i.e. individuals or groups that have bought properties from HSB. Any entity that buys any property from HSB will automatically become a member.

HSB owns the tallest building in Sweden; the Turning Torso.

External links
 The HSB web site (Swedish)

Housing cooperatives in Sweden